Brigadier Sikandar Khan (born 9 November 1961) was the commander of the artillery corps of the IV Corps. He was due to retire in 2014, but he voluntarily retired in 2013 as a one-star general to run his own security company, Ever Ready Security Management (Pvt) Ltd. He was offered to be the director of National University of Modern Languages after his voluntary retirement in 2013 but he respectfully refused to expand his security company. Khan has been awarded the Sitara-i-Imtiaz for his distinguished services.

Career 
Khan was commissioned as a second lieutenant in the 35 Heavy Regiment of Artillery in March 1982. He has commanded an Infantry Battalion, a Mountain Artillery Regiment, and a Divisional Artillery Brigade. He has also served as the Deputy Inspector General Frontier Corps (Balochistan), and served at various key staff appointments at the Division, Corps and Unit level.

Khan has served in the Military Intelligence as a captain on the Western border (Afghanistan) and as a major in the interior Sindh (Pakistan). He is a graduate of the Command and Staff College, National Defense University, University of Balochistan, Canadian Forces College and the National University of Modern Languages.

Khan joined the United Nations as an expert on Afghanistan and South East Asia. As a major, Khan has served as a company commander/term commander and as a 2IC in his parent unit 35 Self-Propelled Heavy Artillery Regiment. He has also served as General Staff Officer-2 (GSO-2) in 14th Infantry Division. He graduated from the Command and Staff College as a major and received his bachelor's degree. As a lieutenant colonel, Khan has served as General Staff Officer-1 (GSO-1) at the Rangers Headquarters in Sindh and General Staff Officer-1 (GSO-1) at the headquarters of the XXX Corps. He also graduated from the National Defense University as a lieutenant cololonel and received his master's degree in war studies.

In 2005, Khan was promoted as FBTS (Fit Brigadier Two Step). During his 1 year of service as a full colonel (colonel), he served as Colonel Staff at the Headquarters of the 8th Infantry Division.

As a brigadier, Khan took over the command of Artillery for 8th Infantry Division. In 2007, Brigadier Khan was selected to attend Canadian Forces College (Toronto) where he displayed brilliant performance and received a commendation letter from the Chief of Army Staff. He also received his master's degree in national security studies from Canadian Forces College (Toronto). In late 2008, he was posted as Deputy Inspector General Frontier Corps (Balochistan, Quetta) where he commanded approximately 48,000 Frontier Corps troops along the Pak-Afghan Border. He also studied at University of Balochistan (Quetta) while serving as DIGFC (Balochistan) and received his master's degree in International Relations.

As DIGFC (Balochistan), Khan worked jointly with the United States Army and ISAF and was awarded by Force Commander (ISAF) Afghanistan for his co-operation and support. From 2009 to 2010, attended the National Defense University (Islamabad) and received his master's degree in National Defense Studies.

In 2010, Khan was posted as Commander Artillery IV Corps. In 2012, he completed his masters in business administration from National University of Modern Languages. In early 2012, Khan became the chairman of the Soldier Welfare Organization Lahore and managed all commercial ventures including Fortress Stadium.

In July 2013, Khan retired voluntarily and started his own security company, Ever Ready Security Management (Pvt) Ltd. He has also started his new business in the renewable energy sector, Solar Vision (Pvt) Ltd, a joint venture of pm e of Germany.

Today, Khan is the COO of Top City, Ever Ready Security, Solar Vision and several other business adventures.

Education

Deputy Inspector General Frontier Corps (DIGFC) appointment 
As Deputy Inspector General Frontier Corps (DIGFC), Khan successfully dealt with challenges like Insurgency in Balochistan, joint operations with the United States Army and ISAF, political instability in Balochistan, a law and order situation in Balochistan and the 2008 Ziarat earthquake. During his stay as DIG FC Balochistan, he was a member of the tripartite negotiation team (Pakistan, Afghanistan and Canada) and attended meetings in UAE and Murree (Pakistan).

Awards 
On 23 March 2012, Khan was awarded the prestigious Sitara-i-Imtiaz (Military) by president Asif Ali Zardari for his distinguished services rendered for World Peace and for his educational achievements.

References 

Living people
1961 births
Pashtun people
People from Kohat District